Pettaikaali is a 2022 Indian Tamil-language romantic mystery drama streaming television series that airs on Aha Tamil. Its producer and show runner was Vetrimaaran, and directed by Rajkumar. 

The story is about a village boy named Pandi, who is a Jallikattu player. It is the first Tamil streaming series on the traditional bull-chasing sport Jallikattu. Produced by Grass Root Film Company the series stars Kishore, Kalaiyarasan, Sheela Rajkumar, Bala Hasan and Vela Ramamoorthy and others. The series comprised eight episodes and was released on Aha Tamil on 21 October 2022.

Synopsis
The story about a Village boy name Pandi a bull that belongs to the girl he loves with deceptive tricks which rekindles the bygone animosity between the families and that drives him to learn the techniques to tame a bull for real.

Cast
 Kalaiyarasan as Pandi
 Kishore as Muthaiyaa
 Sheela Rajkumar as Thenmozhi
 Bala Hasan
 Antony as Parthiban
 Vela Ramamoorthy as Selvasekharan
 Goutham

Production

Casting
Kalaiyarasan was cast in the male lead role as Pandi, will play a bull tamer for the first time in his career.  Antony will play another bull tamer called Parthiban, Sheela Rajkumar will essay the role of Thenmozhi, who rears bulls. Actor Kishore was cast as Muthaiyaa and Vela Ramamoorthy as Selvasekharan, the village head of sorts.

Original soundtrack

Title song
It was written by La Rajkumar. It was sung by Santhosh Narayanan.

Soundtrack

Episodes

References

External links 
 
 Pettaikaali at Aha Tamil

Tamil-language web series
2022 Tamil-language television series debuts
Aha (streaming service) original programming
Tamil-language action television series
Tamil-language mystery television series
Tamil-language romance television series